Sir Thomas Blake, 2nd Baronet, died 1642.

Biography

Blake was the eldest son of Sir Valentine Blake, 1st Baronet and his first wife, Margaret, daughter of Robuck French.

Blake was Sheriff with his father, though the latter was removed from office for refusing the oath of supremacy in 1611. He was Mayor of Galway for the term 1637–38. He was an alderman, and MP for the town in 1634–35.

Blake was killed in the town when a cannon, built by its citizens, exploded, killing him and a number of others.

He married Juliane Browne, daughter of Geoffrey, and was succeeded by his son, Valentine, in 1642. He had three other sons and several daughters.

See also
 Blake baronets

References

 Roll of Honour: The Mayors of Galway, William Henry, Galway, 2002.
 Dictionary of Irish Biography, p. 589, Cambridge, 2010.

Politicians from County Galway
Mayors of Galway
1642 deaths
17th-century Irish people
People of the Irish Confederate Wars
Baronets in the Baronetage of Ireland
Year of birth missing